Keweenaw can refer to the Keweenaw Peninsula, or its derivatives:

 Keweenaw Bay
 Keweenaw Bay Ojibwa Community College
 Keweenaw County, Michigan
 Keweenaw Fault
 Keweenaw Mountain Lodge and Golf Course Complex
 Keweenaw National Historical Park
 Keweenaw Rocket Range
 Keweenaw Underwater Preserve
 Keweenaw Waterway
 Keweenawan Supergroup
 keweenawite